José Augusto Rosa (born 4 October 1966 in Ourinhos), commonly known as Capitain Augusto, is a Brazilian military police officer and politician, member of the Liberal Party (PL).

History
During the 2014 state elections, Rosa was elected Federal Deputy for São Paulo, garnering 46,905 votes (representing 0.22% of the valid votes). In that election, he was benefited by the voted garnered by Federal Deputy Tiririca, from his same party.

Rosa is founder of the Brazilian Military Party, which couldn't get enough signatures to be registered before the 2014 elections.

He voted to impeach President Dilma Rousseff and in favor of the Constitutional Amendment to limit public expenses (PEC 241) in 2016. In 2017, he was favorable to the Labour Reform (PL 6787/2016) and the two complaints of the Federal Public Prosecutor's Office (MPF) against President Michel Temer in August and in October.

Augusto got 242,327 votes (1.15% of the valid votes) in the 2018 state elections and was re-elected Federal Deputy. He was the 3rd most voted candidate of the Liberal Party (then Party of the Republic) and the 10th most voted of the state.

In January 2021, Augusto launched his candidacy for President of the Chamber of Deputies in the 2021 election, despite his party's support to candidate Arthur Lira (PP-AL).

References

External links
 
 
 

1966 births
Living people
People from Ourinhos
Liberal Party (Brazil, 2006) politicians
Members of the Chamber of Deputies (Brazil) from São Paulo
21st-century Brazilian politicians